Darío is a crater on Mercury. It has a diameter of 151 kilometers. Its name was adopted by the International Astronomical Union (IAU) in 1976. Dario is named for the Nicaraguan poet Rubén Darío, who lived from 1867 to 1916.

Darío lies on the western rim of the much larger Aneirin crater.  The highest of several scarps that cut across the floor of Darío corresponds with the rim of Aneirin.

Hollows
Hollows are present within Darío, scattered across the crater floor.

References

Impact craters on Mercury